Balraj Kundu is an Indian politician. He was elected to the Haryana Legislative Assembly as the representative from Meham in the 2019 Haryana Legislative Assembly election as an independent candidate. Previously, he associated with Bharatiya Janata Party.

References 

1971 births
Living people
Bharatiya Janata Party politicians from Haryana
People from Rohtak district
Haryana MLAs 2019–2024